Ab Zalu-ye Vosta-ye Neqareh Khaneh (also Romanized as Āb Zālū-ye Vosţā-ye Neqāreh Khāneh; also known as Āb Zālū-ye Mīānī and Āb Zālū-ye Vosţā) is a village in Kabgian Rural District, Kabgian District, Dana County, Kohgiluyeh and Boyer-Ahmad Province, Iran. At the 2006 census, its population was 68, in 15 families.

References 

Populated places in Dana County